The Sigmaringen enclave was the exiled remnant of France's Nazi-sympathizing Vichy government which fled to Germany during the Liberation of France near the end of World War II in order to avoid capture by the advancing Allied forces. Installed in the requisitioned Sigmaringen Castle as seat of the government-in-exile, Vichy French leader Philippe Pétain and a number of other collaborators awaited the end of the war.

History

Background 

Nazi Germany invaded France in May 1940 during the early part of World War II. The Armistice of 22 June 1940 ended hostilities, dividing France into two zones: an Occupied zone in the north and west, and a nominally "free zone" (Zone libre) in the south and east. Known officially as the "French State", the  became known as the "Vichy regime" for the location of its nominal capital. The regime was headed by Marshal Philippe Pétain, who was given full powers to control the regime. Vichy lost its military force, but continued to exercise jurisdiction over most of Metropolitan France until the gradual collapse of the Vichy regime following the Allied invasion in June 1944 and the ongoing liberation of France.

Transition 

On 17 August 1944, Vichy's head of government and minister of foreign affairs Pierre Laval held the last government council with five of his government ministers. With permission from the Germans, he attempted to call back the prior National Assembly with the goal of giving it power and thus impeding the communists and de Gaulle. So he obtained the agreement of German ambassador Otto Abetz to bring Édouard Herriot, (President of the Chamber of Deputies) back to Paris. But ultra-collaborationists Marcel Déat and Fernand de Brinon protested to the Germans, who changed their minds and took Laval to Belfort along with the remains of his government, "to assure its legitimate security", and arrested Herriot.

Also on 17 August, Cecil von Renthe-Fink, "special diplomatic delegate of the Führer to the French Head of State", asked Pétain to allow himself to be transferred to the northern zone.
Pétain refused and asked for a written formulation of this request.
The written text is submitted to Pétain: "The Reich Government instructs that the transfer of the Head of State be carried out, even against his will".
Faced with the Marshal's continued refusal, the Germans threatened to bring in the Wehrmacht to bomb Vichy.
After having requested the Swiss ambassador  to bear witness to the Germans' blackmail, Pétain submitted. When Renthe-Fink entered the Marshal's office at the Hôtel du Parc with General von Neubronn "at 7:30 p.m.", the Head of State was supervising the packing up of his suitcases and papers.
The next day, 20 August 1944, Pétain was taken against his will by the German army to Belfort and then, on 8 September to Sigmaringen in southwestern Germany, where dignitaries of his regime had taken refuge.

Formation 

Hitler requisitioned the Sigmaringen Castle belonging to the Hohenzollerns in the town of Sigmaringen in Swabia, southwestern Germany. This was then occupied and used by the Vichy government-in-exile from September 1944 to April 1945. Vichy head of state Marshal Philippe Pétain was brought there against his will, and refused to cooperate, and ex-Prime Minister Pierre Laval also refused. Despite the efforts of the collaborationists and the Germans, Pétain never recognized the Sigmaringen Commission. The Germans, wanting to present a facade of legality, enlisted other Vichy officials such as Fernand de Brinon as president, along with Joseph Darnand, Jean Luchaire, Eugène Bridoux, and Marcel Déat.

On 7 September 1944, fleeing the advance of Allied troops into France, while Germany was in flames and the Vichy regime ceased to exist, a thousand French collaborators (including a hundred officials of the Vichy regime, a few hundred members of the French Militia, collaborationist party militants, and the editorial staff of the newspaper Je suis partout) but also waiting-game opportunists also went into exile in Sigmaringen.

Militia leaders sought to recruit new members to swell the ranks of the Franc-Garde by finding sympathizers, especially in the enforced labor camps of prisoners in Germany. Their goal was to promote the ideal of a true National Revolution by actively preparing for an underground struggle by creating Maquis groups.  was designed to parachute in political agitators, who, when the time came, would sow panic and prepare future agents who would be able to infiltrate French society more easily than German agents could.

Legal status 

The Castle received official designation from Germany as extraterritorialized to France and became a French enclave legally, complete with flag-raising. It was a matter of some importance to attempt to gain legal recognition for the government in exile from other countries, however at Sigmaringen, there were only the embassies of Germany and of Japan and an Italian consulate which maintained a presence. The governmental commission was thus a legally French enclave from September 1944 through April 1945.

Commission 

The offices used the official title French Delegation or the French Government Commission for the Defense of National Interests.

The commission had its own radio station (Radio-patrie, Ici la France) and official press (Le Petit Parisien), and hosted the embassies of the Axis powers: Germany, Italy and Japan. The population of the enclave was about 6,000, including known collaborationist journalists, the writers Louis-Ferdinand Céline and Lucien Rebatet, the actor Robert Le Vigan, and their families, as well as 500 soldiers, 700 French SS, prisoners of war and French civilian forced laborers.

Daily life 

Pétain and his ministers, although "on strike" were lodged in the requisitioned Sigmaringen castle. Pétain chose a suite that wasn't too big, as it was less cold. Céline describes at length the  Brasserie where the French gathered to follow the news of the approaching Allied armies and to talk about the latest rumors about the imminent, albeit improbable, German victory in the war.

New arrivals lived with difficulty in the cramped dwellings of the city under the rumblings of American bombs in the summer, but it was worse during the intensely cold winter that reached  in December 1944: Having left France in a panic ahead of advancing Allied forces, they arrived exclusively with summer clothing, and suffered from the cold. Inadequate housing, insufficient food, promiscuity among the paramilitaries, and lack of hygiene facilitated the spread of numerous illnesses, including flu and tuberculosis, and a high mortality rate among children; ailments that were treated as best they could by the only two French doctors, Doctor Destouches (Céline's real-life surname) and Bernard Ménétrel.

Dissolution 

On 21 April 1945 General de Lattre ordered his forces to take Sigmaringen. The end came within days. By the 26th, Pétain was captured by French authorities in Switzerland, and Laval had fled to Spain. Brinon, Luchaire, and Darnand were captured, tried, and executed by 1947. Other members escaped to Italy or Spain.

Exilees 

Exilees included the unwilling Pétain and Laval, the Commission members, as well as several thousand other collaborators or those sympathetic to the Nazis. Some prominent residents of the enclave include:

 Abel Bonnard
 Maud de Belleroche
 Jean Bichelonne
 Victor Barthélemy
 Louis-Ferdinand Céline
 Victor Debeney
 Lucette Destouches
 Roland Gaucher
 Jacques Bouly de Lesdain
 Robert Le Vigan
 Corinne Luchaire
 Bernard Ménétrel
 Georges Oltramare
 Lucien Rebatet
 Simon Sabiani

Filmography 

Several documentaries or fictionalized documentaries have been released about the Sigmaringen enclave. These include:

(VHS).
 The darkness – terminus Sigmaringen [Die Finsternis, Germany, 2005]a documentary by Thomas Tielsch, after the novel by Louis-Ferdinand Céline, K-Films, 2006, 82 min. (DVD).
 Sigmaringen, the last refuge documentary-fiction by Serge Moati, Arte France, 2015, 78 min.

See also 

 Collaboration with the Axis Powers during World War II
 Épuration légale
 Foreign relations of Vichy France
 France–Germany border
 Free France
 French prisoners of war in World War II
 French Resistance
 German occupation of France
 Government of Vichy France
 Italian occupation of France during World War II
 Liberation of France
 Liberation of Paris
 Military history of France during World War II
 Operation Dragoon
 Provisional Government of the French Republic
 Pursuit of Nazi collaborators
 Zone libre

References 

Notes

Footnotes

Works cited 

 

 

 

 

 

 

 

 
 

 

 

 

 

 

 

 

1944 in France
1944 in Germany
1945 in Germany
French collaboration during World War II
French people of World War II
Governments in exile
Vichy France
World War II political leaders
Enclaves and exclaves